The Rolls-Royce Olympus (originally the Bristol B.E.10 Olympus) was the world's second two-spool axial-flow turbojet aircraft engine design, first run in May 1950 and preceded only by the Pratt & Whitney J57, first-run in January 1950. It is best known as the powerplant of the Avro Vulcan and later models in the Concorde SST.

The design dates to a November 1946 proposal by Bristol Aeroplane Company for a jet-powered bomber, powered by four new engines which would be supplied by Bristol Aero Engines. Although their bomber design was ultimately cancelled in favour of the other V bombers, the engine design's use of twin-spool layout led to continued interest from the Air Ministry and continued development funding. The engine first ran in 1950 and quickly outperformed its design goals.

Initially used in the Vulcan, later versions added reheat for use in the supersonic BAC TSR-2. Bristol Aero Engines merged with Armstrong Siddeley Motors in 1959 to form Bristol Siddeley Engines Limited (BSEL), which in turn was taken over by Rolls-Royce in 1966. Through this period the engine was further developed as the Rolls-Royce/Snecma Olympus 593 for Concorde.

Versions of the engine were licensed to Curtiss-Wright in the US as the TJ-32 or J67 (military designation) and the TJ-38 'Zephyr', although none saw use. The Olympus was also developed with success as marine and industrial gas turbines, which were highly successful. As of 2018, the Olympus remains in service as both a marine and industrial gas turbine.

Background

Origins

At the end of World War II, the Bristol Engine Company's major effort was the development of the Hercules and Centaurus radial piston engines. By the end of 1946, the company had only 10 hours of turbojet experience with a small experimental engine called the Phoebus which was the gas generator or core of the Proteus turboprop then in development. In early 1947, the parent Bristol Aeroplane Company submitted a proposal for a medium-range bomber to the same specification B.35/46 which led to the Avro Vulcan and Handley Page Victor. The Bristol design was the Type 172 and was to be powered by four or six Bristol engines of  thrust to the Ministry engine specification TE.1/46.

The pressure ratio would be an unheard of 9:1. To achieve this, the initial design used a low-pressure (LP) axial compressor and a high-pressure (HP) centrifugal compressor, each being driven by its own single-stage turbine. This two-spool design eliminated the need for features such as variable inlet guide vanes (Avon, J79), inlet ramps (J65), variable stators (J79) or compressor bleed (Avon) which were required on single spool compressors with pressure ratios above about 6:1. Without these features an engine could not be started nor run at low speeds without destructive blade vibrations. Nor could they accelerate to high speeds with fast acceleration times ("spool up") without surge. The design was progressively modified and the centrifugal HP compressor was replaced by an axial HP compressor. The Bristol Type 172 was cancelled though development continued for the Avro Vulcan and other projects.

Initial development

The first engine, its development designation being BOl.1 (Bristol Olympus 1), had six LP compressor stages and eight HP stages, each driven by a single-stage turbine. The combustion system was novel in that ten connected flame tubes were housed within a cannular system: a hybrid of separate flame cans and a true annular system. Separate combustion cans would have exceeded the diameter beyond the design limit, and a true annular system was considered too advanced.

In 1950, Dr (later Sir) Stanley Hooker was appointed as Chief Engineer of Bristol Aero Engines.

The BOl.1 first ran on 16 May 1950 and was designed to produce  thrust and to be free from destructive rotating stall on start up to idle speed and to be free from surging on fast accelerations to maximum thrust. The engine started without a problem and Hooker, supervising the first test run and displaying the confidence he had in the design, slammed the throttle to give a surge-free acceleration to maximum power. The thrustmeter showed . The next development was the BOl.1/2 which produced  thrust in December 1950. Examples of the similar BOl.1/2A were constructed for US manufacturer Curtiss-Wright which had bought a licence for developing the engine as the TJ-32 or J67 for the projected F-102. The somewhat revised BOl.1/2B, ran in December 1951 producing  thrust.

The engine was by now ready for air testing and the first flight engines, designated Olympus Mk 99, were fitted into a Canberra WD952 which first flew with these engines derated to  thrust in August 1952. The first production Olympus, the Mk 101, entered service in late 1952 at a rated thrust of 11,000 lb, a weight of 3,650 lb, and with a TBO of 250 hours.

Variants

The Olympus was developed extensively throughout its production run, and the many variants can be described as belonging to four main groups.

Initial non-reheat variants were designed and produced by Bristol Aero Engines and Bristol Siddeley and powered the Avro Vulcan. These engines were further developed by Rolls-Royce Limited.

The first reheat variant, the Bristol Siddeley Olympus Mk 320, powered the cancelled BAC TSR-2 strike aircraft. A further reheat variant was the Rolls-Royce/Snecma Olympus 593, developed to power Concorde in the 1960s. The Olympus 593 is a prime example of "propulsion and airframe integration". A variable intake was developed, along with a variable throat and thrust reversing system, to optimise the performance of the engine when used on Concorde. Looking ahead to future supersonic transports, due to noise limits for supersonic transport category airplanes, studies were conducted on ejector suppressors, leading to the conclusion that "a new, low bypass ratio version of the 593 could be suitable for future generations of supersonic transport aircraft".

The American Curtiss-Wright company tested a license-developed version known as the J67 and a turboprop designated TJ-38 Zephyr. Neither design was produced.

Further derivatives of the Olympus were produced for ship propulsion and land-based power generation.

Applications

 Avro Vulcan 
 BAC TSR-2
 Concorde

Proposed aircraft applications
Over the years, the Olympus was proposed for numerous other applications including:
 C104 which led to the C105 Avro Arrow: BOl.3"
 Avro 718: BOl.3 The Type 718 was a military transport aircraft with up to 110 seats.
 Avro 739 to OR339 (the requirement that culminated in TSR2): BOl.21R
 Avro 740: 3 x Mk 551
 Avro 750: 2 x Mk 551
 Avro Vulcan Phase 6 (B3): BOl.23, a development of the Mk 301. Different engine configurations, BOl.21, BOl.21/2 and BOl.23, with either reheat or an aft fan, were proposed for this aircraft to provide the required increase in take-off thrust.
 Bristol T172: B.E.10
 Bristol T177
 Bristol T180
 Bristol T198: Mk 591. Early supersonic airliner design (132 seats). The engine was a civilianised BOl.22R.
 Bristol T201: Mk 551
 Bristol T202
 Bristol T204 to OR339: BOl.22SR (simplified reheat)
 Bristol T205: Mark 551
 Bristol T213
 Bristol T223: Mk 593. Later supersonic airliner design (100 seats). Engine as Mk 591 with zero stage LP compressor and cooled HP turbine.
 de Havilland design to OR339: BOl.14R, BOl.15R. Developed from BOl.6R.
 Handley Page HP98: Pathfinder variant of Victor.
 Handley Page Victor B1: Mk 104
 Handley Page Victor Phase 3
 Handley Page HP107
 Handley Page Pacific
 Hawker P.1121: BOl.21R
 Hawker P.1129 to OR339: BOl.15R
 Martin/General Dynamics RB-57F Canberra: Mk 701 developed from Mk 301.
 Gloster P492/3: Mk 591
 Republic F-105 Thunderchief: BOl.21 for possible sale to RAF.
 Saab 36
 Saab 37 Viggen
 Vickers VC10: Development of Mk 555 with aft fan.

Engines on display

 Imperial War Museum North, Manchester – Mk 101
 RAF Museum Cosford – Mk 320
 Gatwick Aviation Museum Charlwood Surrey – Two Mk 320
The Rolls-Royce Heritage Trust Collection (Derby - UK) Mk 101 and Mk 593 and a Marine version.
 Montrose Air Station Heritage Centre – Bristol B.E.10
 Museum of Science and Industry (Manchester) – Mk 202 (Engine is displayed as a Mk 201 but its ECU plate reveals it as a Mk 202)
 South Yorkshire Aircraft Museum, Doncaster, England - Mk.104 on loan from the Rolls-Royce Heritage Trust.

Specifications (Olympus 101)

See also

References
Notes

Citations

Bibliography

 Baxter, Alan. Olympus – the first forty years. Derby, UK: Rolls-Royce Heritage Trust, 1990. 
 Blackman, Tony. Vulcan Test Pilot. London, UK: Grub Street, 2009. 
 Bullman, Craig. The Vulcan B.Mk2 from a Different Angle. Bishop-Auckland, UK: Pentland Books, 2001. 
 Fildes, David W. The Avro Type 698 Vulcan Barnsley, UK: Pen % Sword Aviation, 2012, 
 Hooker, Stanley. Not Much of an Engineer. Marlsborough, UK: Airlife Publishing, 2002.

External links

 Rolls-Royce Heritage Trust
 Turbine Support image of Olympus power station
 enginehistory.org Good image of Mk 301
 Flight cutaway of BOl.1/2A
 "Olympian Heights" 1961 Flight article
 The Mighty Olympus: YouTube Playlist from AgentJayZ

Olympus
Olympus
1950s turbojet engines